Argentino Macedonio Molinuevo Jr. (born 7 February 1945) is an Argentine equestrian. He competed at the 1968 Summer Olympics, the 1972 Summer Olympics and the 1976 Summer Olympics. He is the son of equestrian Argentino Molinuevo Sr.

References

External links
 

1945 births
Living people
Argentine male equestrians
Olympic equestrians of Argentina
Equestrians at the 1968 Summer Olympics
Equestrians at the 1972 Summer Olympics
Equestrians at the 1976 Summer Olympics
Place of birth missing (living people)